California's 28th State Senate district is one of 40 California State Senate districts. After a May 13, 2020 special election to replace outgoing Senator Jeff Stone of La Quinta, incumbent State Assemblywoman, Melissa Melendez, became State Senator.

District profile 
The district comprises the central and eastern portions of Riverside County (including the Coachella Valley) as well as the southern Inland Empire.

Riverside County – 42.5%
 Cities
 Anza 
 Blythe
 Canyon Lake
 Cathedral City
 Coachella
 Desert Hot Springs
 Indian Wells
 Indio
 Lake Elsinore
 La Quinta
 Murrieta
 Palm Desert
 Palm Springs
 Rancho Mirage
 Temecula
 Wildomar
 Unincorporated Communities
 Aguanga
 Chiriaco Summit
 Desert Center
 Fern Valley
 Homeland
 Idyllwild
 Mecca
 Mesa Verde
 Mountain Center
 North Shore
 Pine Cove
 Pinyon Pines
 Radec
 Ripley
 Sage
 Sky Valley
 Thermal
 Valle Vista
 Whitewater
 Winchester

Election results from statewide races

List of senators 
Due to redistricting, the 28th district has been moved around different parts of the state. The current iteration resulted from the 2011 redistricting by the California Citizens Redistricting Commission.

Election results 1994 - present

2020 (special)

2018

2014

2011 (special)

2010

2006

2002

1998

1994

See also 
 California State Senate
 California State Senate districts
 Districts in California

References

External links 
 District map from the California Citizens Redistricting Commission

28
State Senate 28
Coachella Valley
Blythe, California
Cathedral City, California
Coachella, California
Desert Hot Springs, California
Indian Wells, California
Indio, California
Murrieta, California
Palm Desert, California
Palm Springs, California
Rancho Mirage, California
San Bernardino National Forest
San Jacinto Mountains
Temecula, California